John Filippi (born 27 February 1995) is a French auto racing driver who competes in the TCR Europe Touring Car Series for Sébastien Loeb Racing.

Racing career

Karting
Filippi started his karting career in 2007 in the Cadet class. He made his first international appearance in 2009. In 2009 Filippi competed in the European KF3 championship where he finished 40th in a Vortex powered Tony Kart. He also competed in the French Grand Prix Open Karting. The following two years the driver from Corsica competed in the KF2 class. He ended the 2011 season with two top-ten classifications in the French and Grand Prix Open championships.

Single-seaters
After six years of karting John Filippi made is autoracing debut in 2007 at Circuit Paul Armagnac. The Corsican was entered by Equipe Palmyr in the amateur Single-seater V de V Challenge driving a Tatuus FR2000. Driving against other old Formula Renault and Formula Master cars he finished twelfth in his first race. He raced six races in his inaugural racing season and finished 25th in the standings.

The following season Filippi switched to the Bossy Racing team racing a Tatuus N.T07 Formula Master chassis. This decision made the young driver highly successful. He won the first three races of the season at Circuit de Barcelona-Catalunya. He went on to win eleven of the eighteen races in the season. Besides the three races he won in Barcelona Filippi won two races in Motorland Aragón, three races at Lédenon and three races at Magny-Cours. Towards the end of the racing season he made his debut in the Eurocup Formula Renault 2.0 with RC Formula. At Circuit de Barcelona-Catalunya he finished 22nd in the first and 27th in the second race.

World Touring Car Championship

2014
On March 19, 2014 it was announced that John Filippi would race in the World Touring Car Championship. Filippi joined Campos Racing driving one of their TC2 SEAT León's.

Filippi became the youngest ever points scorer in a WTCC race at the Race of Morocco in Marrakech. This was followed by consistent pace in the TC2 class all season before clinching a class win at the Race of Japan

2015

For 2015 with the departure of Dušan Borković from Campos Racing, Filippi was promoted to the TC1 Chevrolet Cruze for the 2015 season.

Again Filippi scored points to finish in Marrakech and at the Nordschleife. At the Race of China Filippi set a new career-best qualifying position with P7, before suffering from an accident in Race 1 which forced him to retire. In Thailand, it was much the same story with a strong qualifying but a Race 1 incident with Tiago Monteiro forced him to retire once again.

At the Race of Qatar qualified 10th and therefore lined up on pole position for Race 2. Filippi is currently the youngest driver ever to have started from pole position in a WTCC race at 20 years and 331 days old.

2016

On February 9, 2016, Filippi's main sponsor Oscaro announced that Filippi would be continuing with Campos Racing in the TC1 Chevrolet for the 2016 World Touring Car Championship season. It was also announced that 4-time world champion Yvan Muller would be accompanying Filippi as a driver coach for the season.

Racing record

Complete World Touring Car Championship results
(key) (Races in bold indicate pole position) (Races in italics indicate fastest lap)

† Did not finish the race, but was classified as he completed over 90% of the race distance.
‡ Half points awarded as less than 75% of race distance was completed.

Complete World Touring Car Cup results
(key) (Races in bold indicate pole position) (Races in italics indicate fastest lap)

† Driver did not finish the race, but was classified as he completed over 90% of the race distance.

Complete TCR Europe Touring Car Series results
(key) (Races in bold indicate pole position) (Races in italics indicate fastest lap)

† Driver did not finish the race, but was classified as he completed over 90% of the race distance.

References

External links
  
 

1995 births
Living people
Sportspeople from Bastia
French racing drivers
Formula Renault Eurocup drivers
World Touring Car Championship drivers
World Touring Car Cup drivers
24H Series drivers
FIA Motorsport Games drivers
Campos Racing drivers
Karting World Championship drivers
RC Formula drivers
Sébastien Loeb Racing drivers
Hyundai Motorsport drivers
TCR Europe Touring Car Series drivers